Vitória Island is an archipelago and island in Espírito Santo state, Brazil. Vitória, the capital of Espírito Santo, is situated on the main island. The main island has an area of 89 km² and a population of 358,875, according to 2015 estimates.

The central massif of the island contains the Fonte Grande State Park as well as the Gruta da Onça Park, Pedra dos Olhos Ecological Reserve and the Tabuazeiro Park.

References

Atlantic islands of Brazil
Archipelagoes of the Atlantic Ocean
Landforms of Espírito Santo